Södermanland Wing, also F 11 Nyköping, or simply F 11, is a former Swedish Air Force wing with the main base located in south-east Sweden.

History
The wing was set up outside Nyköping in 1940 as a long range reconnaissance wing with two squadrons of S 16B. After the war, the aircraft were replaced with J 9 from Svea Wing (F 8) and an additional squadron of B 3 from Västmanland Wing (F 1).

In 1946, two additional squadrons of S 18 were added.

In 1948, F 11 became the sole Swedish operator of three squadrons of S 31 when the B 3 and J 9 became obsolete.

In 1953, J 28 jet fighters were used for one year to train pilots for the introduction of the S 29 in 1954.

The S 18 squadrons were replaced by the S 32 in 1958 and the S 29s by J 35s in 1964. These four squadrons served until the decommissioning of the wing in 1980.

The airfield was used as a cargo airport from 1984 and from 1997 serves as Stockholm-Skavsta Airport  for international flights.

Barracks and training areas
Skavsta Airfield outside Nyköping. The new establishment was completed on 14 October 1941. The airfield had two runways, one east-west of 2500 m (longest of the Swedish Air Force) and one north-south of 2000 m.

Heraldry and traditions

Coat of arms
Blazon: "Or, the provincial badge of Södermanland, a griffon segreant sable, armed and langued gules".

Colours, standards and guidons
A colour was presented to the wing on 22 May 1942 at Stora torget in Nyköping by His Riyal Highness Crown Prince Gustaf Adolf. The colour is preserved at the Swedish Army Museum. Blazon: "On blue cloth in the centre the badge of the Air Force; a winged two-bladed propeller under a royal crown proper. In the first corner, the provincial badge of Södermanland; a griffon segreant or, armed and langued gules".

Commanding officers

Commanding officers from 1941 to 1980. The commanding officer was referred to as "wing commander" and had the rank of colonel.

1941–1945: Birger Schyberg
1945–1949: Arthur Henricson
1949–1951: Greger Falk
1951–1959: Henrik Nordström
1959–1961: Nils Personne
1961–1962: Bo Lindgren
1962–1966: Claes-Erik Abramson
1966–1980: Kurt Hagerström

Names, designations and locations

See also
List of military aircraft of Sweden

References

Notes

Print

Web

Wings of the Swedish Air Force
Military units and formations established in 1941
Military units and formations disestablished in 1980
1941 establishments in Sweden
1980 disestablishments in Sweden
Disbanded units and formations of Sweden